Jakks Pacific, Inc. is an American company that designs and markets toys and consumer products, with a range of products that feature numerous children's toy licenses. The company is named after its founder, Jack Friedman, who had previously founded LJN and THQ and presided over the company until retiring as CEO and chairman after March 31, 2010, a month before his death on May 3, 2010.

Jakks produces action figures, electronics, dolls, dress-up, role play, Halloween costumes, kids' furniture, vehicles, plush, art activity kits, seasonal products, infant/preschool, construction toys, and pet toys sold under various proprietary brands including Jakks Pacific, Creative Designs International, Road Champions, Funnoodle, Go Fly a Kite, Jakks Pets, EyeClops, Plug It In & Play TV Games, Girl Gourmet, Kids Only!, Tollytots and Disguise. Jakks is a licensee of several hundred trademarks including Disney, Star Wars and Nintendo.

History

Jakks Pacific, Inc. was founded in 1995. Jakks acquired several companies, including Remco, Child Guidance, and Road Champions in 1997, Berk and Flying Colors in 1999, Pentech in 2000, Toymax, Go Fly A Kite and Funnoodle in 2002, Color Workshop and Trendmasters in 2003, Play Along Toys in 2004, Pet Pal Corp. in 2005, Creative Designs International in 2006, and Kids Only Toys, Tollytots, and Disguise in 2008.

In February 2005, Jakks Pacific was instructed to restate the financial statements for fiscal year 2003 to account for the acquisition of Toymax, Trendmasters and P&M Products.

In 2010, the company formed Pacific Animation Partners LLC, a joint venture between that company and Dentsu Entertainment USA, Fremantle and Topps, to launch the Monsuno property in 2012. 

In 2012, Jakks Pacific announced the successful negotiation of licences for The Dark Knight Rises and The Amazing Spider-Man, promoting new toy ranges at the New York and other International Toy Fairs.

In 2014, the company launched Jakks Meisheng Trading, a joint venture with Meisheng Culture and Creative Corp., to bring its toys to China. In 2016, the two created Studio JP, a joint venture to produce animation.

Products

The company makes a variety of toys including Plug It In and Play TV games, various electronics, and action figures.  The company also licenses global brand names for manufactured toys.

Plug It In & Play TV Games
Plug It In & Play TV Games interactive products are a series of plug-n-play game devices produced by Jakks Pacific. When connected to a television set via RCA connector cables, the user is able to play a pre-defined selection of video games. Some models are collections of ports of games by companies such as Atari and Namco, while others are collections of original games. Some versions facilitate the addition of games, via proprietary GameKey expansion cards, and/or include wireless features.

List of TV Games

 1 vs 100
 Activision
 Are You Smarter Than A 5th Grader?
 Atari series
 Atari Joystick Controller TV Video Game System
Atari Paddle Controller TV Game System
 Avatar: The Last Airbender
 The Batman
 Bejeweled Deluxe
 Big Buck Hunter Pro
 Big Buck Safari
 Blue's Room
 Capcom
 Cars 2
 Deal or No Deal
 Disney series
 Disney Princess
 Dora the Explorer series
 Dragon Ball Z
 DreamWorks Animation
 EA Sports Madden & NHL 95
 Elmo's World
 Fantastic Four
 Frogger
 Go, Diego, Go!
 Hannah Montana
 High School Musical
 Jeopardy!
 Max Force
 Mortal Kombat
 ¡Mucha Lucha!
 My Little Pony
 Pac-Man and Ms. Pac-Man series (Namco series)
 PAW Patrol series
 Nicktoons series
 Pixar
 Power Rangers series
 The Price Is Right
 Phineas and Ferb
 Retro Arcade featuring Space Invaders
 Scooby-Doo
 Sesame Street
 Shrek
 Spider-Man series (Notable games include: The Amazing Spider-Man and the Masked Menace, Spider-Man's Villain Roundup, more)
 SpongeBob SquarePants series (Notable games include: The Fry-Cook Games, Jellyfish Dodge, more)
 Star Wars series
 Superman
 Super Silly Makeover
 Tele-Doodle
 Thomas & Friends series (Games include: Right on Time and Learning Circus Express)
 Triple Header Sports
 Total Nonstop Action Wrestling
 Toy Story series
 Ultimotion series (Unlicensed Wii Clones)
 The Walking Dead Zombie Hunter
 Wall-E
 Winnie the Pooh
 Winx Club
 Wheel of Fortune series
 WWE
 World Poker Tour

Visual electronics
EyeClops Toy Microscope - A 200X magnifying device that plugs into a TV.
EyeClops Bionic Eye Multi-Zoom - An EyeClops with 100X, 200X, and 400X magnification that plugs into a TV.
EyeClops Mini Projector - A mini projector that projects SD content up to 60 inches with loud & very clear audio.
EyeClops Night Vision - An infrared night vision device, in head-mounted and neck-strapped models.
EyeClops BioniCAM - A portable version of the EyeClops with an LCD screen, and the ability to save pictures and videos to a USB storage device.

Handheld games
vMigo - A handheld virtual pet game, which can be docked into a TV adapter.
BioBytes - A handheld game, where the player uses their animal to attack the computer's, or a friend's (wirelessly).
Telestory

Toy vehicles
Fly Wheels
Xtreme Performance Vehicle (XPV)
Custom Garage
Shock Racers
MXS
GX Racers
GX Skate
Power Trains

Infant and toddler toys
Child Guidance
KnotWud

Girls' activities
It's a Girl Thing
If you Say Sew!
Lucky Bee Bee
Girl Gourmet
Style Six

Boys' activities
Max Force
Real Construction
Spy Net Toys

Stationery products
BloPens
Vivid Velvet
Pentech
UltraSharp

Seasonal
Funnoodle
Go Fly a Kite
The Storm
Disguise Halloween Costumes

Pet
White Bites
Naturally Convenient

Action figures
WWE
Rocky
Dragon Ball Z
Pokémon
UFPO
Real Steel
Ryuji Juwara
Total Nonstop Action Wrestling

Licensed brands
The company also licenses various brands for toy production, including Black & Decker, Cabbage Patch Kids, Care Bears, DC Universe, Marvel Universe, Sonic the Hedgehog, Disney, Star Wars, and Nintendo.

See also
 Hasbro
 Mattel
 Majesco Entertainment
 MGA Entertainment
 Radica Games
 Spin Master

References

External links
Official Jakks Pacific Inc website

Companies based in Santa Monica, California
Manufacturing companies based in Greater Los Angeles
Video game companies of the United States
American companies established in 1995
Toy companies established in 1995
Radio-controlled car manufacturers
Toy companies of the United States
Godzilla (franchise)
1995 establishments in California
Companies listed on the Nasdaq